The 1910 Bucknell football team was an American football team that represented Bucknell University as an independent during the 1910 college football season. In its first season under head coach Byron W. Dickson, the team compiled a 2–6 record.

Schedule

References

Bucknell
Bucknell Bison football seasons
Bucknell football